The 1952 Tulsa Golden Hurricane football team represented the University of Tulsa during the 1952 college football season. In their fifth year under head coach Buddy Brothers, the Golden Hurricane compiled an 8–2–1 record (3–1 against Missouri Valley Conference opponents) and lost to Florida, 14–13, in the 1953 Gator Bowl. The team defeated Kansas State (26–7), Oklahoma A&M (23–21), Arkansas (44–34) and Texas Tech (26–20), tied Cincinnati (14–14), and lost to #19 Houston (7–33).

Schedule

References

Tulsa
Tulsa Golden Hurricane football seasons
Tulsa Golden Hurricane football